Braeden Matthew Lemasters (born January 27, 1996) is an American actor, musician, and singer. He began his career as a child actor, receiving recognition for his role as Albert Tranelli in the TNT comedy-drama series Men of a Certain Age (2009-2011). He has made guest appearances in several television series such as, Criminal Minds, ER, House, Grey's Anatomy and Amazon Prime Video's The Romanoffs. He is also the lead guitarist and singer for the American alternative rock band Wallows.

In films, Lemasters has appeared in the thriller film The Stepfather (2009), the romantic comedy film Easy A (2010), the family comedy film A Christmas Story 2 (2012) and the horror film Totem (2017).

Early life
Braeden Matthew Lemasters was born in Warren, Ohio, to Dave and Michelle Lemasters.  He has an older brother, Austin. When he was nine his family moved to Santa Clarita, California, so that he could pursue a career in acting. He grew up listening to The Beatles and Arctic Monkeys, and learned how to play guitar.

Career

Acting
Lemasters began his acting career at the age of 9, playing the role of Frankie in an episode of Six Feet Under (2005). In 2006, he played the role of a child with Autism syndrome in the medical drama television series House. Subsequently he had minor roles in Criminal Minds, ER, and The Closer. In 2007, he appeared as Jacob Marshall-LaHaye in the  Christian drama television film Love's Unending Legacy, for which he earned his first Young Artist Award nomination. Later that year he was featured in Sacrifices of the Heart, Life, Grey's Anatomy and Wainy Days.

From 2009, Lemasters began starring in the TNT series Men of a Certain Age as Albert Tranelli. He earned various awards and nominations for the role, including a Peabody Award and a nomination for Young Artist Award for Best Performance in a TV Series. He was in the show for two seasons until it ended in 2011. He also had a supporting role in the 2009 remake of The Stepfather.

In 2010, he appeared in the teen romantic comedy film Easy A, as the young version of Penn Badgley's character Todd. The following year, he starred as Ralphie Parker in the sequel film of A Christmas Story. 

From 2013-2014, Lemasters starred as Victor McAllister in ABC's Betrayal. The next year, Lemasters starred in the horror comedy film R.L. Stine's Monsterville: Cabinet of Souls alongside Dove Cameron and Tiffany Espensen. The film was based on the novel by R.L. Stine of the same name.

In 2017, Lemasters was cast as Trevor in the second season of T@gged. He reprised the role again in the third season of the series. In 2018, he starred in the adventure comedy drama Flock of Four, in which he played Joey Grover, a talented amateur pianist in 1950s Pasadena.

Music
In addition to acting, Lemasters is also a singer and lead guitarist for the band Wallows with Cole Preston (drums), and Dylan Minnette (singer, guitar). The band won the Battle Of The Bands Contest (2010) sponsored by radio station KYSR in 2010 and played on the 2011 Vans Warped Tour. They have since performed at several popular Los Angeles venues including the Roxy Theater and Whisky a Go Go.

The band began releasing songs independently in April 2017 starting with "Pleaser", which reached number two on the Spotify Global Viral 50 chart.

In 2018, Wallows signed a deal with Atlantic Records and released their major label debut EP, Spring, including singles "Pictures of Girls" and "These Days". They performed "Pictures of Girls" on The Late Late Show with James Corden on May 8, 2018. The band released their debut studio album, Nothing Happens in 2019, which featured the hit single "Are You Bored Yet?" In 2020, they released their second EP Remote. The band released their sophomore album "Tell Me That It's Over" in March 2022.

Discography

Filmography

Film

Television

Video games

Awards and nominations

References

External links

 

1996 births
21st-century American male actors
American male child actors
American male film actors
American male television actors
Living people
Male actors from Ohio
People from Warren, Ohio
Wallows members